The 2001 Purdue Boilermakers football team represented Purdue University during the 2001 NCAA Division I-A football season.

Schedule

Roster

Season summary

Iowa

Seniors drafted by the NFL

Awards and honors
Travis Dorsch, Ray Guy Award

References

Purdue
Purdue Boilermakers football seasons
Purdue Boilermakers football